Walton Dhaka (Bengali: ওয়ালটন ঢাকা) is a professional field hockey team based in Dhaka. It competes in the Hockey Champions Trophy Bangladesh. It's one of the founding teams of the league. Founded in 2022, the team is owned by Walton Group.

History
Walton Dhaka was formed by Walton Group in 2022. Shafiul Azli became the head coach of the team in inaugural season.

Current technical staff
As of 1 October 2022

Roster

References

Field hockey in Bangladesh
Field hockey teams
Sport in Dhaka